Limahlania is a monotypic genus of flowering plants belonging to the family Gentianaceae. The only species is Limahlania crenulata.

Its native range is Southern Indo-China to Western Malesia.

References

Gentianaceae
Gentianaceae genera
Monotypic Gentianales genera